Sergei Yuryevich Dubrovin (born 25 January 1982) is a Russian professional football coach and a former player. He is assistant manager with FC Torpedo Vladimir.

External links
 
 

1982 births
Sportspeople from Tashkent
Living people
Russian footballers
Association football midfielders
FC Dinamo Minsk players
FC Vitebsk players
FC Torpedo Vladimir players
Belarusian Premier League players
Russian expatriate footballers
Expatriate footballers in Belarus
Russian football managers